Robert J. Moriarty (born September 9, 1946) is an American Marine F-4B fighter pilot who holds the record as the youngest naval aviator (at age 20) in the Vietnam war, achieving the rank of captain in the Marines at age 22. Before leaving military service in 1970, he recorded 824 combat missions.

He holds 14 international aviation records including the record for flight time between New York to Paris in two different categories. In 1984, at age 37, he was in the headlines for flying, on March 31 at 11:20, between the pillars of the Eiffel tower aboard a Beechcraft Bonanza aircraft. He was part of a team entered in the Paris to Libreville air race but an engine failure south of Portugal forced him to drop out. After repairing the plane, and encouraged by Richard Fenwic, he turned his attention to the Eiffel Tower. When asked why he had done it, he replied: "Just for fun".

Publications
Moriarty published a story about his Vietnam experiences entitled Crap Shoot in 1993. "Crap Shoot" was one of a dozen or so books or "booklets" written by Moriarty. He wrote: "I had eleven months in-country and orders to report to El Toro in California in two-months. My log showed 253 combat missions and I spent every single one of them hurling myself at the earth making little sticks out of big sticks."

Moriarty piloted the L-19, better known as the "Bird Dog", a Cessna "forward air control" (FAC) and Observation aircraft.

The works by Robert and Barb are 4.5 x 6 inch professionally printed, mini books titled "Princess Novels" & "Peanut Books". In addition to Crap Shoot, titles include The Princess and the Frog and The Princess and the Pilot.

Moriarty wrote of his service as; a "position whose glory had been lost to those of the military jet aircraft pilots". He states that the "Marine ground pounder called the FAC in their Cessna' and the pilots of the A-37, 'The Small Giants of the PAC'".

Family
He has a twin brother, James Robert Moriarty.

References 

1946 births
Living people
American aviators
American aviation writers
Historians of the Vietnam War
American aviation record holders